Euchalcia siderifera is a moth of the family Noctuidae. It is found in Italy, Greece and from Asia Minor through Russia up to the Ural Mountains and Altai Mountains.

The wingspan is 28–34  mm.

Subspecies
Euchalcia siderifera siderifera (Asia Minor, Caucasus, southern Urals, Kazakhstan, Tien Shan, Altai Mountains)
Euchalcia siderifera achaiae Dufay, 1968 (Greece)

External links 
 www.lepiforum.de
 www.nic.funet.fi
 Fauna Europaea

Plusiinae